You've Got a Good Love Comin' is the third studio album by American country music artist Lee Greenwood, released in 1984. It was certified Gold.

Track listing

Side One
 "You've Got a Good Love Comin'" (Danny Morrison, Jeff Silbar, Van Stephenson) - 2:53
 "(I Found) Love in Time" (Glen Ballard, Clif Magness) - 4:08
 "I Don't Want to Wake You" (Wayland Holyfield, Peter McCann) - 3:13
 "Love Me Like I'm Leavin' Tonight" (Pat Bunch, Mary Ann Kennedy, Pam Rose) - 3:28
 "Worth It for the Ride" (Jerry Crutchfield, Lee Greenwood) - 2:48

Side Two
 "Two Heart Serenade" (Michael Clark) - 3:45
 "Fool's Gold" (Timmy Tappan, Don Roth) - 3:42
 "Lean, Mean, Lovin' Machine" (Don Cook, Rafe Van Hoy) - 2:38
 "Even Love Can't Save Us Now" - (Fred Burch, Jan Crutchfield, Paul Harrison) - 2:47
 "God Bless the U.S.A." (Greenwood) - 3:09

Personnel
Adapted from liner notes.

Pete Bordonali - acoustic guitar (tracks 4, 7, 9), electric guitar (tracks 1, 6, 8, 10)
David Briggs - piano (tracks 3, 7, 9)
Jerry Carrigan - drums (track 5)
Steve Gibson - acoustic guitar (tracks 1, 2, 4-6, 8, 10)
Vince Gill - background vocals (tracks 1, 7)
Greg Gordon - background vocals (tracks 1, 6, 7)
Lee Greenwood - lead vocals (all tracks)
David Hungate - bass guitar (tracks 1-3, 6, 8, 10)
David Innis - keyboards (tracks 2, 3)
Shane Keister - keyboards (track 5), piano (track 4)
Sheri Kramer - background vocals (tracks 4, 9)
The Nashville String Machine - strings (tracks 3, 4, 7, 9)
Bobby Ogdin - keyboards (tracks 1, 6, 8, 10)
Cindy Richardson - background vocals (tracks 8, 10)
Hargus "Pig" Robbins - piano (tracks 1, 8, 10)
Brent Rowan - electric guitar (track 3)
Lisa Silver - background vocals (tracks 4, 8-10)
James Stroud - drums (all tracks except 5)
Diane Tidwell - background vocals (tracks 4, 8-10)
Pete Wade - electric guitar (tracks 4, 5)
Bergen White - string arrangements (tracks 3, 4, 7, 9)
Jack Williams - bass guitar (tracks 4, 5, 7, 9)
Dennis Wilson - background vocals (tracks 1, 6, 7)
Reggie Young - electric guitar (tracks 6, 7, 9)

Charts

Weekly charts

Year-end charts

Certifications

References

1984 albums
Lee Greenwood albums
MCA Records albums
Albums produced by Jerry Crutchfield